Erdmann is a first name and surname, and may refer to:

Surname
Carl Erdmann (1898—1945), German historian
Eduard Erdmann (1896—1958), Baltic German pianist and composer
Hans Otto Erdmann (1896–1944), member of the German resistance
Hugo Erdmann (1862—1910), German chemist
Johann Eduard Erdmann (1805—1892), German philosopher
Karin Erdmann (born 1948), German mathematician
Karl Gottfried Erdmann (1774—1835), German physician and botanist
Mojca Erdmann (born 1975), German opera soprano
Nikolai Erdman (1900—1970), Russian dramatist
Otto Linné Erdmann (1804–1869), German chemist
Rhoda Erdmann (1870–1935), German cell biologist
Susi Erdmann (born 1968), German luger and bobsledder
Ralph Erdmann, American pathologist
Wilfried Erdmann (born 1940), German sailor
 Wolfgang Erdmann (1898–1946), German general of paratroopers

First name
Erdmann Copernicus (died 1573), German scholar, not related to the astronomer
Erdmann August, Hereditary Prince of Brandenburg-Bayreuth (1615–1651)
Erdmann II, Count of Promnitz (1683–1745)

See also

Erdman

German-language surnames
German given names